Schindelholz may refer to one of the following persons;

Jean-Claude Schindelholz (born 1940), Swiss association football player
Lorenz Schindelholz (born 1966), Swiss bobsledder
Nicolas Schindelholz (1988–2022), Swiss association football player

Surnames of Swiss origin